A starred review is a book review marked with a star to denote a book of distinction or particularly high quality. A starred review can help to increase media coverage, bookstore placement and sales of a book.

References

Book review